An automotive scan tool (scanner) is an electronic tool used to interface with, diagnose and, sometimes, reprogram vehicle control modules.

There are many types from just as many manufacturers, one of the most familiar being the Snap-On Inc. "brick", or MT2500/MTG2500. Snap-On, Hella Gutmann Solutions, OTC/SPX, Xtool india, Autel, Launch, Vetronix/Bosch and a number of other companies produce various types of scan tools, from simple code readers to highly capable bi-directional computers with programming capabilities.
The scan tool is connected to the vehicle's data link connector (DLC) and, depending on the particular tool, may only read out diagnostic trouble codes or DTC's (this would be considered a "code reader") or may have more capabilities. Actual scan tools will display live data stream (inputs and outputs), have bi-directional controls (the ability to make the controllers do things outside of normal operations) and may even be able to calibrate/program modules within certain parameters. However, a typical scan tool does not have the ability to fully reprogram modules because it requires a J-2534 pass-through device and specific software.

Voltas IT created a new generation diagnostic tool – OBDeleven, the device which easily connects to the car, monitors all systems, and activates new car's features. It supports Audi, Volkswagen, SEAT, Škoda, Lamborghini, and Bentley.

OBD 1 vs OBD 2 the vehicle will also dictate what the scan tool is able to display. If the vehicle is equipped with OBD 1 it will have significantly less available data when compared to a vehicle equipped with OBD 2.

See also
OBD-II PIDs list of data readable with a scan tool
ELM327 very common integrated circuit inside scan tools
OBDuino onboard computer made with Arduino that has the scan tool functions
Data link connector (automotive) standard connector for OBD
On-board diagnostics#OBD-II last specification for OBD
Pass through device (automotive)

References 

Automotive electronics